Lawrence Gwyn Van Loon (1903, New York City - 7 November 1985, Gloversville, New York) was an American general practitioner, amateur historical linguist and forger.

Biography
Van Loon was possibly a direct descendant of Jan Van Loon, who had emigrated from Liège to New Netherland in the seventeenth century.

He learned the remains of the Mohawk Dutch language, the taol, from his maternal grandfather, Walter Hill (1856-1925), a schoolteacher. At the age of ten he went to Reading, New York, for a journey to the Mohawk Valley.

During the summers of 1930 and 1932 he spent an internship at the Wilhelmina Hospital in Amsterdam. In 1932 he married a Dutch woman, Grietje Prins.  Between 1955 and 1967 he was medical director on Hawaii.

He was a member of the Holland Society and of the Dutch Settlers Society of Albany. Van Loon was also keeper of the records and translator of the Association of Blauvelt Descendants, descendants of Gerrit Hendrickszen (Blauvelt), who moved from Deventer to New Netherland in 1638.

His lifelong relationship with the Dutch language made him an authority on the old Dutch language spoken on the East Coast of the United States. However, several of his publications seemed to be suspect.

In 1980 it was established that work of Van Loon was based on forged documents. Among his suspect findings is the Tawagonshi treaty. Other discoveries by Van Loon that proved to be false before publication were an early deed to Manhattan, a map of Albany from 1701, and a map of the Hudson River.

Personal life
Van Loon married to Grietje Prins in Alkmaar on 25 August 1932. He retired and moved to Gloversville in 1982, and died there in 1985.

Publications
 Bachman, Van Cleaf, Alice P. Kenney & Lawrence G. Van Loon. 1980. ‘ “Het Poelmeisie”. An introduction to the Hudson Valley Dutch dialect’. New York History 61, 161-185.
 Van Loon, L.G. 1938. Crumbs from an old Dutch closet. The Dutch dialect of Old New York. The Hague: Martinus Nijhoff.
 Van Loon, L.G. 1939. 'Ave atque Vale, Jersey Lag Duits Verdwijnt'. Onze Taaltuin 8, 91-95, 107-119.

References
Sijs, Nicolien van der (2009) Cookies, Coleslaw, and Stoops. The influence of Dutch on the North American languages Amsterdam: Amsterdam University Press

External links
 Description of the Lawrence Gwyn Van Loon Collection in the New York State Library
 Texts by and from Van Loon in the dbnl
 Charles T. Gehring, William A. Starna & William N. Fenton: 'The Tawagonshi Treaty of 1613: The Final Chapter'. In: New York History, October 1987, pag. 373-393
  Jan Noordegraaf: 'Schuim en asch. Nederlands wat verdween'. In: Nieuwsblad voor afgestudeerden van de opleiding Nederlands van de Vrije Universiteit Amsterdam, jrg. 35 (november 2010), pag. 20-27
  Clara van Beek en Jan Noordegraaf: 'Nederlands in Noord-Amerika. Literatuur in het Leeg Duits'. In: Nieuw Letterkundig Magazijn, 2011, Jaargang 29, pag 19-24

Linguists from the United States
Forgers
1903 births
1985 deaths
20th-century linguists